The Museum of Polish Military Technology (Polish: Muzeum Polskiej Techniki Wojskowej) is a military museum in the Mokotów district of Warsaw, Poland. It is a branch of the Polish Army Museum. It is located in former Fort IX of the Warsaw Fortress.

Description 
The museum is located in a former Russian fortress which is divided by Powsińska Street in two parts, the larger part being the museum and the smaller part being Szczubełka Park. In the 1990s, with the retirement of obsolete military equipment, the Polish Army Museum built a warehouse, which later opened as an outdoor exhibition branch of the museum.

Because the branch has a larger area than the main museum, the site is also used for storage and restoration of equipment.

Exhibits

Tanks

Other vehicles

Planes

Literature
 Zawadzki Wojciech, Polskie muzea wojskowe: informator, Towarzystwo Przyjaciół Muzeum Tradycji POW. Bydgoszcz, 2002.

Gallery

External links

 Official website

Military Technology
Military and war museums in Poland